Filadelfeia-Chalkidona is a municipality in the Central Athens regional unit, Attica, Greece. The seat of the municipality is the town Nea Filadelfeia. The municipality has an area of 3.650 km2.

Municipality
The municipality Filadelfeia–Chalkidona was formed at the 2011 local government reform by the merger of the following 2 former municipalities, that became municipal units:
Nea Chalkidona
Nea Filadelfeia

References

Municipalities of Attica
Populated places in Central Athens (regional unit)